The Bremen v. Zapata Off-Shore Company, 407 U.S. 1 (1972), was a United States Supreme Court case in which the Court considered when a U.S. court should uphold the validity of a contractual forum selection clause.

The parties had entered into an agreement for a drilling rig to be towed from Louisiana to Italy, which included a clause stating that disputes would be settled by a court in England. When a storm forced the towing party to make land in Tampa, Florida, the other party sued there. After the lower courts refused to uphold the forum selection clause, the Supreme Court held that it was enforceable unless the party seeking to avoid it could meet the high burden of showing it to be unreasonable or unjust.

Rationale

See also 
 List of United States Supreme Court cases, volume 407

References

External links

United States Supreme Court cases
United States admiralty case law
United States civil procedure case law
United States forum selection case law
1972 in United States case law
United States Supreme Court cases of the Burger Court